We Belong Together: 6 Years of Success is the first compilation album by Dutch-English pop group Caught in the Act. It was released by ZYX Music on 24 August 1998 in German-speaking Europe. The album peaked at number 29 on the German Albums Chart.

Track listing
Adapted from album booklet.

Charts

Release history

References

1998 compilation albums
Caught in the Act albums